Peru competed at the 2022 Winter Olympics in Beijing, China, from 4 to 20 February 2022. The country last competed in 2014.

Peru's team consisted of female alpine skier. Ornella Oettl Reyes was the country's flagbearer during the opening ceremony. Meanwhile a volunteer was the flagbearer during the closing ceremony.

Competitors
The following is the list of number of competitors participating at the Games per sport/discipline.

Alpine skiing

By meeting the basic qualification standards Peru qualified one female alpine skier.

See also
Tropical nations at the Winter Olympics

References

Nations at the 2022 Winter Olympics
2022
Winter Olympics